Laster is an English language occupational surname for a shoemaker and may refer to:
Andy Laster (born 1961), American jazz saxophonist
Charlie Laster (born 1954), American politician
Donald Laster (born 1958), former American football player

See also 
 Lasker (surname)
 Last (surname)
 Lester
 Lister (surname)
 Luster (surname)
 Lauter (surname)
 Laster (disambiguation)

References

External links 

English-language surnames
Occupational surnames
English-language occupational surnames